Phong Điền is a rural district of Thừa Thiên Huế province in the North Central Coast region of Vietnam. As of 2003, the district had a population of 105,017. The district covers an area of 954 km2. The district capital lies at Phong Điền.

Geography 
It borders Quảng Trị province and Hương Trà district. It has 15 communes, Điền Hương, Điền Môn, Phong Bình, Phong Chương, Điền Lộc, Phong Hoà, Điền Hoà, Phong Hải, Điền Hải, Phong Mỹ, Phong Thu, Phong Hiền, Phong An, Phong Xuân, Phong Sơn, and one township Phong Điền. It has a varied geography with mountains, plains and coastline on the South China Sea.

The district was the homeland of Nguyễn Tri Phương, the general who commanded the Nguyễn dynasty's army in the 1850s and 1860s when the French began their colonisation of Indochina, and Nguyễn Đình Chiểu, the anti-colonial poet.

The district was created by Emperor Minh Mạng in 1834 as part of the then province of Thuận Hóa.

History 
On March 11, 1977, the district was merged with those of Hương Trà and Quảng Điền to become the district of Hương Điền in the province of Bình Trị Thiên (1976–89). On September 29, 1990, Hương Điền was redivided into the three original districts and put in Thừa Thiên–Huế Province.

References

Districts of Thừa Thiên Huế province